Li Jie (born 8 July 1979, in Beijing) is a Chinese football player who competed at the 2004 Summer Olympics and the 2007 FIFA Women's World Cup, the latter on home soil.

International goals

External links
 Profile at Yahoo! Sports

1979 births
Living people
Chinese women's footballers
China women's international footballers
Footballers at the 2004 Summer Olympics
Footballers at the 2008 Summer Olympics
Olympic footballers of China
2003 FIFA Women's World Cup players
2007 FIFA Women's World Cup players
Footballers from Beijing
Asian Games medalists in football
Footballers at the 2002 Asian Games
Footballers at the 2006 Asian Games
Asian Games silver medalists for China
Asian Games bronze medalists for China
Women's association football defenders
Medalists at the 2002 Asian Games
Medalists at the 2006 Asian Games
FIFA Century Club